Major Adrian Consett Stephen MC (1894 – 14 March 1918) was an Australian artillery officer and playwright. He was awarded the Military Cross during World War I.

History
Stephen was the second son of solicitor Consett Stephen, of the Sydney firm of Stephen, Jaques, and Stephen.
He was educated at Sydney Grammar School and the University of Sydney, graduating BA in 1913 and LL.B in 1915. He enlisted in 1916 and fought in France with the Royal Field Artillery. He was mentioned in despatches in May 1917, awarded the Croix de Guerre in June 1917 for action on The Somme, then the Military Cross in October 1917 for his conduct at the Battle of Passchendaele.

Works
 1908 Echoes
 1918 Four plays
 1918 Stories, burlesques and letters from Hermes
 1918 An Australian in the R.F.A. (letters and diary)

Productions
On 7 December 1922 his "hopelessly pessimistic" play Futurity was presented at the Institute of Arts and Letters clubroom by members of the Institute, led by Beresford Fowler.

Commemoration
In 1930 Stephen's father presented to the Community Playhouse the "Adrian Consett Stephen Cup" to be awarded to the "Australian one-act play of greatest literary merit".

References 

1894 births
1918 deaths
British Army personnel of World War I
20th-century Australian non-fiction writers
Australian male poets
20th-century Australian dramatists and playwrights
Australian male dramatists and playwrights
Australian recipients of the Military Cross
Royal Field Artillery officers
20th-century Australian male writers
20th-century Australian poets
British military personnel killed in World War I